Helioscope is a comics and illustration studio based in Portland, Oregon. Members of the studio work both individually and as collaborators on a number of high-profile mainstream and independent comic books. These include Superman, Batman, Wonder Woman, Spider-Man, The Fantastic Four, World's Finest Comics, Swamp Thing, and Fables.

Helioscope was founded in 2002 by Matthew Clark, Terry Dodson, Paul Guinan, David Hahn, Drew Johnson, Karl Kesel, Steve Lieber, Ron Randall, Matthew Clark, Pete Woods, and Rebecca Woods as "Mercury Studio". The studio significantly expanded its membership and adopted a new name, "Periscope Studio", in June 2007. In April 2016, it was announced that the studio would change its name to "Helioscope".

Notable members 
 Colleen Coover
 Terry Dodson 
 Karl Kesel
 Steve Lieber 
 Erika Moen
 Jeff Parker
 Ron Randall

Former members
 Kieron Dwyer
 David Hahn 
 Joëlle Jones
 Rick Remender
 Chris Samnee
 Pete Woods

References

External links
 Helioscope web page
 Helioscope blog
 Helioscope on Tumblr
 Helioscope on Twitter

Comics studios